Trymalitis macarista is a species of moth of the family Tortricidae. It is found on Fiji.

References

Moths described in 1934
Chlidanotini